Akers Pond is a  water body located in Coos County in northern New Hampshire, United States, in the town of Errol. Water from Akers Pond flows via Clear Stream to the Androscoggin River and thence into Maine.

The lake is classified as a coldwater fishery, with observed species including rainbow trout and largemouth bass.

See also

List of lakes in New Hampshire

References

Lakes of Coös County, New Hampshire